Milan Nedoma is a Czech former ice hockey defenseman.

Nedoma played a total of 19 seasons of hockey most of which in the Czech Extraliga. He was selected in the 8th round, 166th overall in the 1990 NHL Draft by the Buffalo Sabres.

Coaching career
Nedoma served as head coach for the Czech club Hluboka nad Vltavou Knights for 7 seasons starting in the 2009–10 season before being recalled during the 2015–16 season on 18 November. He was replaced by Miroslav Sulista.

Career statistics

External links
bio

1972 births
Living people
BK Mladá Boleslav players
Buffalo Sabres draft picks
Czech ice hockey defencemen
Czechoslovak ice hockey defencemen
HC Kometa Brno players
HC Plzeň players
HC Sparta Praha players
HK Dukla Trenčín players
Motor České Budějovice players
Stadion Hradec Králové players
VHK Vsetín players
Ice hockey people from Brno